Karolína Plíšková and Kristýna Plíšková were the defending champions, but chose not to participate this year.
Danka Kovinić and Stephanie Vogt won the title, defeating Lara Arruabarrena and Lucie Hradecká in the final, 4–6, 6–3, [10–3].

Seeds

Draw

References 
 Draw

Gastein Ladies - Doubles
2015 Doubles
Gast
Gast